Silver spoon is an idiomatic expression in English synonymous with wealth, especially inherited wealth.

Silver Spoon may also refer to:

Arts and entertainment
 "Silver Spoon", a song by Jefferson Airplane members Paul Kantner and Grace Slick, from their album Sunfighter
 Silver Spoon (manga), a manga series by Hiromu Arakawa adapted into an anime series and live-action film

 Gin no Spoon, a manga series by Mari Ozawa adapted into a live-action television series
 The Silver Spoon, a 1933 British comedy crime film
 "Silver Spoon", a song by Lily Allen from Sheezus
 "Silver Spoon", a song by Todrick Hall from Forbidden

Literature
 The Silver Spoon (1926), a novel by John Galsworthy in the A Modern Comedy trilogy
 The Silver Spoon, English translation of the Italian cookbook Il cucchiaio d'argento (1950) published by the magazine Domus

Television
 Silver Spoon (Russian TV series), a Russian crime drama
 Silver Spoons, a 1980s US sitcom
 "The Silver Spoon", an episode of BBC 1967 series The Forsyte Saga
 A young filly living in the village of Ponyville located in the nation of Equestria.

Other uses
 Silver Spoon (sugar), a brand of sugar owned by British Sugar
 Silver Spoon (horse), an American Hall of Fame racehorse

See also
 Silver Spoon Set (1960), an Italian film directed by Francesco Maselli
 Dessert spoon, silver in color
 Silver fork novel, a 19th-century genre